The fifth series of On the Buses originally aired between 19 September 1971 and 26 December 1971, beginning with "The Nursery". The series was produced and directed by Derrick Goodwin and designed by Alan Hunter-Craig. All the episodes in this series were written by Ronald Chesney and Ronald Wolfe except for episodes thirteen and fourteen which were written by Bob Grant and Stephen Lewis.

Cast
 Reg Varney as Stan Butler
 Bob Grant as Jack Harper
 Anna Karen as Olive Rudge
 Doris Hare as Mabel "Mum" Butler
 Stephen Lewis as Inspector Cyril "Blakey" Blake
 Michael Robbins as Arthur Rudge

Episodes

{|class="wikitable plainrowheaders" style="width:100%; margin:auto;"
|-
! scope="col" style="background:#783C78;color:white;" | Episode No.
! scope="col" style="background:#783C78;color:white;" | Series No.
! scope="col" style="background:#783C78;color:white;" | Title
! scope="col" style="background:#783C78;color:white;" | Written by
! scope="col" style="background:#783C78;color:white;" | Original air date

|}

See also
 1971 in British television

References

External links
Series 5 at the Internet Movie Database

On the Buses
1971 British television seasons